ISO 20400: Sustainable procurement -- Guidance "provides guidance to organizations, independent of their activity or size, on integrating sustainability within procurement". It is intended for stakeholders involved in, or impacted by, procurement decisions and processes, complementing ISO 26000, Guidance on social responsibility, by "focusing specifically on the purchasing function".

History
The standard was developed by ISO project committee ISO/PC 277 under the leadership of Jacques Schramm, a French management consultant. Work started in 2013 and the first edition of ISO 20400 was published on 21 April 2017.

Main features of the standard 
The ISO 20400:2017 standard is structured as follows:
Scope
Normative references
Terms and definitions
Understanding the fundamentals
Integrating sustainability into the organization's procurement policy and strategy
Organizing the procurement function toward sustainability
Integrating sustainability into the procurement process

Researcher Anne Staal notes that within supply chain management, the guidance "necessitates a change in ... buyer-seller relationships", reinforcing the finding of Rentizelas et al. that coercive pressure can “quickly force an industrial sector” to attain a level of sustainable procurement ... but it is not sufficient to develop sustainable practices in suppliers if these organisations themselves do not show initiative".

Adoption
Construction company Balfour Beatty has been identified as the first organisation to undertake a full evaluation using the standard.

See also 
 Quality management system
 List of ISO standards
 Conformity assessment
 International Organization for Standardization

References

External links 
ISO 20400 — Sustainable procurement — Guidance
ISO PC 277 — Sustainable procurement
iso20400.org - not for profit self-assessment website

20400